The Östliche Karwendelspitze (2,537 m) is a mountain formed from Wetterstein limestone in the Karwendel mountains on the border between Bavaria and Tyrol. It is the highest mountain of the Northern Karwendel chain and the highest German peak in the Karwendel. It was first climbed by Hermann von Barth on 4 July 1870.

The summit may be reached in 2½ hours from the Karwendelhaus (1,765 m) on a partially trackless mountain tour that requires Alpine experience. The ascent crosses a grass and schrofen covered ridge east of the Vogelkar cirque. Just below the summit there is a UIAA grade I climbing section. There is a challenging descent which is recommended via the Grabenkar cirque through partly rocky and scree-covered terrain (I) with a fast scree run (Schuttabfahrt), however it is too laborious for an ascent.
The Karwendelhaus in turn may be reached either from Scharnitz or from Hinterriß over the Kleiner Ahornboden. Because of the long approach along the valley to the Karwendelhaus, a two-day tour should be considered as an alternative to a 10½ hour round day trip.

The Östliche Karwendelspitze may also be climbed by skiers in the spring through the Grabenkar. In winter this is usually not possible due to the high risk of avalanche and the long routes.

References

Sources 
 Walter Klier: Alpenvereinsführer Karwendel alpin. 14th edition. Bergverlag Rudolf Rother, Munich 1996,

External links 
Tour description
Ski tour from Hinterriß
Report of the first ascent of the Östlichen Karwendelspitze and the Vogelkarspitze on 4 July 1870 by Hermann von Barth (Chapter XIX from the book: Aus den Nördlichen Kalkalpen, Gera 1874, p. 420 ff.)
Mountain tour with GPS Track

Mountains of the Alps
Mountains of Bavaria
Mountains of Tyrol (state)
Two-thousanders of Austria
Karwendel
Two-thousanders of Germany